Rackmax is a product, containing plant growth hormones, sold to hunters and farmers to spray on crops to make them grow faster. It also attracts deer and other hoofed animals, although why it would do so is unclear.

This product may contain a form of auxin, hormones whose ratio controls a plant's growth emphasis.

See also
Auxin
SUPERthrive
Fertilizer

External links
 Rack Max Product Website
 Rackmax discussion on TheVeggieGarden

Agricultural chemicals